Aspidistra umbrosa is a species of flowering plant. Given it was described from an unclassified Aspidistra specimen from another study, neither its distribution nor habitat are known.

Description
This species is a perennial herb. Its rhizome is creeping, and measures  in diameter.

Its style distally widens towards the smooth stigma, which measures  in diameter.

References

Further reading
Tillich, H‐J. "An updated and improved determination key for Aspidistra Ker‐Gawl.(Ruscaceae, Monocotyledons)." Feddes Repertorium 119.5‐6 (2008): 449–462.
Tillich, Hans-Juergen. "The genus Aspidistra Ker-Gawl.(Asparagaceae) in Vietnam." Taiwania 59.1 (2014): 1–8.

External links

umbrosa
Flora of Vietnam
Plants described in 2007